Lynchite may refer to:

Follower of Joseph B. Lynch and his holiness movement
Follower of the investment strategies of Peter Lynch
Person prone to conducting lynching, vigilante executions